Aubert or d'Aubert is a family of the French nobility, and a branch belongs also to the Nobility of Denmark and to the Nobility of Norway. The family originates in the town of Thionville in Lothringen, where their progenitor Jean Aubert was a merchant. Today members live in France, in Denmark, in Norway, in Sweden, and in Germany.

France 
The noble family of Aubert was founded in the Duchy of Lorraine with the ennoblement in 1612 of Jean Aubert, a merchant of Thionville. This town was at the time in Habsburg possession and a part of the Holy Roman Empire until its annexation by France in 1659.

Denmark and Norway 
Jean d'Aubert's great-great-grandson, François Jacques Xavier d'Aubert (1727–1793) emigrated to Denmark in 1752 to take up a career in the Danish army. He became a Dano-Norwegian nobleman in 1776. Separate branches of the family descend from his two sons, both military men: Benoni d'Aubert (1768–1832) who moved to Norway and founded the Norwegian branch of the family, and Jacques d'Aubert (1769–1844), whose son Oskar Aubert (1831-1900) was the ancestor of the Danish and German branches of the family.

Gallery

Prominent members 
 Ludvig Cæsar Martin Aubert (1807–1887), Norwegian philologist
 Michael Conrad Sophus Emil Aubert (1811–1872), Norwegian member of Parliament
 Ebba d'Aubert née Bergström(1819–1860), Swedish pianist
 Ludvig Mariboe Benjamin Aubert (1838–1896), Norwegian jurist and politician
 Andreas Aubert (1851–1913), Norwegian art historian
 Vilhelm Mariboe Aubert (1868–1908), Norwegian jurist
 Axel Aubert (1873–1943), CEO of Norsk Hydro
 Vilhelm Aubert (1922–1988), Norwegian sociologist

See also 
 French nobility
 Danish nobility
 Norwegian nobility

References

Literature 
 Achen, Sven Tito: Danske adelsvåbener : En heraldisk nøgle 1973, Copenhagen.
 Cappelen, Hans: Norske slektsvåpen 1969, Oslo. 2nd ed., 1976.
 Løvenskiold, Herman Leopoldus: Heraldisk nøkkel 1978, Oslo.
 Munthe, Christopher Morgenstierne: Norske slegtsmerker in Norsk slektshistorisk tidsskrift, vol. I. 1928, Oslo.
 Storck, H.: Dansk Vaabenbog 1910, Copenhagen.
 Thiset, Anders and Wittrup, P.L.: Nyt Dansk Adelslexikon 1904, Copenhagen.
 Skandinavisk Vapenrulla, vol. VI. 1966, Malmö.

French noble families
Norwegian noble families
Danish noble families
Families of French ancestry